In enzymology, an inositol 3-methyltransferase is an enzyme that catalyzes the chemical reaction

S-adenosyl-L-methionine + myo-inositol  S-adenosyl-L-homocysteine + 1D-3-O-methyl-myo-inositol

Thus, the two substrates of this enzyme are S-adenosyl methionine and myo-inositol, whereas its two products are S-adenosylhomocysteine and 1D-3-O-methyl-myo-inositol.

This enzyme belongs to the family of transferases, specifically those transferring one-carbon group methyltransferases.  The systematic name of this enzyme class is S-adenosyl-L-methionine:1D-myo-inositol 3-O-methyltransferase. Other names in common use include inositol L-1-methyltransferase, myo-inositol 1-methyltransferase, S-adenosylmethionine:myo-inositol 1-methyltransferase, myo-inositol 1-O-methyltransferase (name based on 1L-numbering, system and not 1D-numbering), and S-adenosyl-L-methionine:myo-inositol 1-O-methyltransferase.  This enzyme participates in inositol phosphate metabolism.

References

 

EC 2.1.1
Enzymes of unknown structure
Inositol